Allen Lane Miller III (born August 10, 1948) is an American professional golfer who played on the PGA Tour in the 1970s and 1980s.

Miller was born in San Diego, California. He had a distinguished amateur career. He attended the University of Georgia, and was a member of the golf team. Miller was the #2 ranked amateur in America in 1969 and 1970 by Golf Digest; he was a member of the 1969 and 1971 Walker Cup teams, and the 1970 Eisenhower Trophy team. He won the 1970 Canadian Amateur Championship.

Miller turned professional in 1971. He played on the PGA Tour for 15 years and had 18 top-10 finishes. He won the 1974 Tallahassee Open by one stroke over Joe Inman, Eddie Pearce and Dan Sikes with a 14-under-par 274. The event was played during the same week as the Tournament of Champions, where most of the Tours elite players played. His best finish in a major was T-15 at The Masters in 1975.

Since retiring from the Tour in 1986, Miller has earned a living primarily as a teaching professional. He also played in a limited number of Senior PGA Tour events; his best finish on this circuit is a T-45 at the 1998 First of America Classic. Miller and his wife Cindy, who is also a golf teaching professional and a former LPGA Tour player, live in western New York. They teach at Wehrle Golf Dome in Buffalo.

Amateur wins
1969 Trans-Mississippi Amateur
1970 Dogwood Invitational, Northeast Amateur, Canadian Amateur Championship, Trans-Mississippi Amateur
1971 Trans-Mississippi Amateur

Professional wins (1)

PGA Tour wins (1)

Results in major championships

Note: Miller never played in The Open Championship

CUT = missed the half-way cut
"T" = tied

U.S. national team appearances
Amateur
Walker Cup: 1969 (winners), 1971
Eisenhower Trophy: 1970 (winners)

See also 

 1971 PGA Tour Qualifying School graduates

References

External links

American male golfers
Georgia Bulldogs men's golfers
PGA Tour golfers
Golfers from San Diego
Golfers from New York (state)
1948 births
Living people